Wayne Thomas (born 10 October 1966) is a Jamaican bobsledder. He competed in the two man and the four man events at the 1994 Winter Olympics. He later became the coach of the national team.

References

External links
 

1966 births
Living people
Jamaican male bobsledders
Olympic bobsledders of Jamaica
Bobsledders at the 1994 Winter Olympics
Bobsledders at the 1998 Winter Olympics
Place of birth missing (living people)